Ee Bhoomi Aa Bhanu is a 2013 Indian Kannada-language directed by KC Venugopal starring Patre Ajith and Saranya Mohan in lead roles.

Cast

 Patre Ajith as Bhanu
 Saranya Mohan as Bhumi
 Suresh Heblikar as the station director
 Sharan
 Mithra

Music

Reception

Critical response 

The Times of India scored the film at 3 out of 5 stars and says " 'Patre' Ajith excels as Bhanu with good dialogue delivery and body language. Sharanya impresses as girl next door. Comedian Sharan's track impresses less. Music by S Premkumar has some catchy tunes, but its overdose tests your patience. Camera by S Premkumar is eye-catching". B S Shivani of Deccan Herald wrote "Ee Bhoomi Ee Bhanu, however, provides a viewer who's sensitive to ills plaguing society, a workable solution. But what about patience". News18 India wrote "P. Rajan has done a decent camera work. S. Premkumar's composition of two songs is good. Despite the presence of good artists, 'Ee Bhumi Aa Bhanu' suffers".

References

2010s Kannada-language films
2013 films